Baddow Park is a settlement in Essex, England.

External links
Baddow Park at Streetmap.co.uk

Hamlets in Essex
City of Chelmsford